Temvria is a village in the Nicosia District of Cyprus, located 2 km south of Evrychou.

References

Communities in Nicosia District